Fresno Municipal Sanitary Landfill in Fresno, California, was the first modern landfill in the U.S., pioneering the use of trenching, compacting, and daily burial to combat rodent and debris problems. It became a model for other landfills around the country, and one of the longest-lived. The landfill was operated by the City of Fresno from 1937 until 1987, when it was closed.

History

Construction and operation
Fresno, like other growing cities, sought a suitable long-term solution to the disposal of municipal solid waste in the 1930s. Jean Vincenz, a civil engineer by training, became Fresno commissioner of public works, city engineer, and manager of utilities in 1931. Vincenz recommended that the city not renew its waste disposal contract with the Fresno Disposal Company, which operated an incinerator at the time. Rather, the city conducted an experiment in the operation of a "sanitary" landfill near its water treatment plant, in which a trench was dug, filled with waste, and then covered with fill dug from an adjacent trench, which would be the next area filled. Vincenz emphasized the importance of compacting the fill, saying that without compaction, the waste would attract rats. The demonstration site opened in 1934, and was judged a success.

The present site was acquired by the city in 1937, opened the same year and began accepting waste. In 1945, the landfill expanded south of Annadale Avenue.

The city kept no records of the types of waste accepted besides billing receipts, however it has been judged that the waste steam included organic materials as well as hazardous materials such as petroleum products, solvents and battery acid.

Closure and cleanup

The EPA's Superfund program began in 1980 and received a notification from the Fresno Solid Waste Management Division regarding the landfill. In May 1981, the Superfund program evaluated the landfill and the city began the process of closing it. The landfill received its last waste on July 1, 1987.

In 1983, the California Department of Health Services conducted tests which found that the site contained methane and vinyl chloride gases that were penetrating into the areas around the landfill. These tests also concluded that contaminants were being found in private ground-water wells around the landfill.

On June 24, 1988, the site was officially proposed as a Superfund site and was finalized on the program's National Priorities List (NPL) on October 10, 1989. The city agreed to begin investigations into monitoring and cleaning up the hazardous aspects of the site. Remediation measures such as landfill cover, landfill gas control, and surface water management systems were constructed between July 1999 and June 2000. A groundwater treatment plant was completed in September 2001.

Some remediated city land adjacent to the landfill has been turned into a baseball, softball, and soccer complex with a playground and picnic tables. It was opened in 2001, named the "Regional Sports Complex" and operated as a Fresno city park.

Landmark status and controversy
It was declared a National Historic Landmark on August 27, 2001. The announcement that a landfill would be designated as a National Landmark was panned in the media and used as an opportunity by some to disparage the environmental policies of George W. Bush, despite the nomination process for this beginning during the previous administration. The Interior Department struggled to deal with the controversy and paused the designation pending further inquiry. It was revealed that the Park Service's advisory board had voted 10–1 to place the landfill on the landmark list.

Description
It is covered with grass. The landfill has no lining.

Impact
According to historian Martin Melosi, the site was "the first landfill to employ the trench method of disposal and the first to utilize compaction." The design became a model for other landfills around the country, and was the accepted best form of municipal disposal in the 1950s and 1960s. The 1970s brought criticism of the method and new disposal options were considered.

For his contribution to this advancement, Jean Vincenz was named assistant chief in the Army Corps of Engineers, operating out of headquarters in Washington, DC. Vincenz was later honored, being named president of the American Public Works Association for his accomplishments.

See also
List of Superfund sites in the United States
National Register of Historic Places listings in Fresno County, California

References

Former landfills in California
History of Fresno, California
Geography of Fresno County, California
Superfund sites in California
National Register of Historic Places in Fresno County, California
Infrastructure on the National Register of Historic Places
National Historic Landmarks in California
1935 establishments in California